The 2020–21 season is Aquila Basket Trento's 26th in existence and the club's 8th consecutive season in the top tier Italian basketball.

Overview

Kit 
Supplier: Nike / Sponsor: Dolomiti Energia

EuroCup

Serie A

Players

Current roster

Depth chart

Squad changes

In

|}

Out

|}

Confirmed 

|}

Coach

Competitions

Supercup

Serie A

Regular season

Playoffs

Quarterfinals

Eurocup

Regular season

Top 16

See also 

 2020–21 LBA season
 2020–21 EuroCup Basketball
 2020 Italian Basketball Supercup

References 

Trento
Trento